Jan Hettema (27 October 1933 – 29 June 2016) was a South African cyclist. He competed in three events at the 1956 Summer Olympics. He was also a successful rally driver and won the South African National Rally Championship five times. He was killed during an armed robbery at his smallholding in Tweedrag near Boschkop, Pretoria on 29 June 2016.

References

External links
 

1933 births
2016 deaths
South African male cyclists
Olympic cyclists of South Africa
Cyclists at the 1956 Summer Olympics
Sportspeople from Leeuwarden
South African rally drivers
South African racing drivers
Dutch emigrants to South Africa